Carly Gullickson and Nicole Kriz were the defending champions, but decided not to participate this year.

Ahsha Rolle and Riza Zalameda won the title, defeating Madison Brengle and Lilia Osterloh 6–4, 6–3 in the final.

Seeds

Draw

References
Main Draw

Odlum Brown Vancouver Open
Vancouver Open